This is a list of the bird species recorded in Bolivia. The avifauna of Bolivia has 1403 confirmed species. Fifteen are endemic, two have been introduced by humans, and 14 are rare or vagrants. An additional 40 species are hypothetical (see below).

Except as an entry is cited otherwise, the list of species is that of the South American Classification Committee (SACC) of the American Ornithological Society. The list's taxonomic treatment (designation and sequence of orders, families, and species) and nomenclature (common and scientific names) are also those of the SACC.

The following tags have been used to highlight several categories.

 (V) Vagrant - a species that rarely or accidentally occurs in Bolivia
 (E) Endemic - a species endemic to Bolivia
 (I) Introduced - a species introduced to Bolivia as a consequence, direct or indirect, of human actions
 (H) Hypothetical - a species recorded but with "no tangible evidence" according to the SACC

Rheas
Order: RheiformesFamily: Rheidae

The rheas are large flightless birds native to South America. Their feet have three toes rather than four which allows them to run faster.

Greater rhea, Rhea americana
Lesser rhea, Rhea pennata

Tinamous
Order: TinamiformesFamily: Tinamidae

The tinamous are one of the most ancient groups of bird. Although they look similar to other ground-dwelling birds like quail and grouse, they have no close relatives and are classified as a single family, Tinamidae, within their own order, the Tinamiformes. They are distantly related to the ratites (order Struthioniformes), that includes the rheas, emus, and kiwis.

Hooded tinamou, Nothocercus nigrocapillus
Gray tinamou, Tinamus tao
Black tinamou, Tinamus osgoodi (H)
Great tinamou, Tinamus major
White-throated tinamou, Tinamus guttatus
Cinereous tinamou, Crypturellus cinereus
Little tinamou, Crypturellus soui
Brown tinamou, Crypturellus obsoletus
Undulated tinamou, Crypturellus undulatus
Brazilian tinamou, Crypturellus strigulosus
Black-capped tinamou, Crypturellus atrocapillus
Variegated tinamou, Crypturellus variegatus
Bartlett's tinamou, Crypturellus bartletti
Small-billed tinamou, Crypturellus parvirostris
Tataupa tinamou, Crypturellus tataupa
Red-winged tinamou, Rhynchotus rufescens
Huayco tinamou, Rhynchotus maculicollis
Taczanowski's tinamou, Nothoprocta taczanowskii
Ornate tinamou, Nothoprocta ornata
Brushland tinamou, Nothoprocta cinerascens
Andean tinamou, Nothoprocta pentlandii
White-bellied nothura, Nothura boraquira
Darwin's nothura, Nothura darwinii
Quebracho crested-tinamou, Eudromia formosa
Puna tinamou, Tinamotis pentlandii

Screamers
Order: AnseriformesFamily: Anhimidae

The screamers are a small family of birds related to the ducks. They are large, bulky birds, with a small downy head, long legs, and large feet which are only partially webbed. They have large spurs on their wings which are used in fights over mates and in territorial disputes.

Horned screamer, Anhima cornuta
Southern screamer, Chauna torquata

Ducks
Order: AnseriformesFamily: Anatidae

Anatidae includes the ducks and most duck-like waterfowl, such as geese and swans. These birds are adapted to an aquatic existence with webbed feet, flattened bills, and feathers that are excellent at shedding water due to an oily coating.

Fulvous whistling-duck, Dendrocygna bicolor
White-faced whistling-duck, Dendrocygna viduata
Black-bellied whistling-duck, Dendrocygna autumnalis
Coscoroba swan, Coscoroba coscoroba (V)
Orinoco goose, Oressochen jubatus
Andean goose, Oressochen melanopterus
Muscovy duck, Cairina moschata
Comb duck, Sarkidiornis sylvicola
Ringed teal, Callonetta leucophrys
Brazilian teal, Amazonetta brasiliensis
Torrent duck, Merganetta armata
Crested duck, Lophonetta specularioides
Puna teal, Spatula puna
Silver teal, Spatula versicolor
Red shoveler, Spatula platalea
Northern shoveler, Spatula clypeata (H)
Blue-winged teal, Spatula discors (H)
Cinnamon teal, Spatula cyanoptera
Chiloe wigeon, Mareca sibilatrix (V)
White-cheeked pintail, Anas bahamensis
Yellow-billed pintail, Anas georgica
Yellow-billed teal, Anas flavirostris
Rosy-billed pochard, Netta peposaca
Black-headed duck, Heteronetta atricapilla
Masked duck, Nomonyx dominicus
Ruddy duck, Oxyura jamaicensis
Lake duck, Oxyura vittata (H)

Guans
Order: GalliformesFamily: Cracidae

The Cracidae are large birds, similar in general appearance to turkeys. The guans and curassows live in trees, but the smaller chachalacas are found in more open scrubby habitats. They are generally dull-plumaged, but the curassows and some guans have colorful facial ornaments.

Sickle-winged guan, Chamaepetes goudotii
Andean guan, Penelope montagnii
Rusty-margined guan, Penelope superciliaris
Red-faced guan, Penelope dabbenei
Spix's guan, Penelope jacquacu
Yungas guan, Penelope bridgesi
Blue-throated piping-guan, Pipile cumanensis
Red-throated piping-guan, Pipile cujubi
Chaco chachalaca, Ortalis canicollis
Speckled chachalaca, Ortalis guttata
Wattled curassow, Crax globulosa
Bare-faced curassow, Crax fasciolata
Razor-billed curassow, Mitu tuberosum
Horned curassow, Pauxi unicornis (E)

New World quails
Order: GalliformesFamily: Odontophoridae

The New World quails are small, plump, terrestrial birds only distantly related to the quails of the Old World, but named for their similar appearance and habits.

Marbled wood-quail, Odontophorus gujanensis
Rufous-breasted wood-quail, Odontophorus speciosus
Stripe-faced wood-quail, Odontophorus balliviani
Starred wood-quail, Odontophorus stellatus

Flamingos
Order: PhoenicopteriformesFamily: Phoenicopteridae

Flamingos filter-feed on shellfish and algae. Their oddly shaped beaks are specially adapted to separate mud and silt from the food they consume and, uniquely, are used upside-down.

Chilean flamingo, Phoenicopterus chilensis
Andean flamingo, Phoenicoparrus andinus
James's flamingo, Phoenicoparrus jamesi

Grebes
Order: PodicipediformesFamily: Podicipedidae

Grebes are small to medium-large freshwater diving birds. They have lobed toes and are excellent swimmers and divers. However, they have their feet placed far back on the body, making them quite ungainly on land.

White-tufted grebe, Rollandia rolland
Titicaca grebe, Rollandia microptera
Least grebe, Tachybaptus dominicus
Pied-billed grebe, Podilymbus podiceps
Silvery grebe, Podiceps occipitalis

Pigeons
Order: ColumbiformesFamily: Columbidae

Pigeons and doves are stout-bodied birds with short necks and short slender bills with a fleshy cere.

Rock pigeon, Columba livia (I)
Scaled pigeon, Patagioenas speciosa
Picazuro pigeon, Patagioenas picazuro
Spot-winged pigeon, Patagioenas maculosa
Band-tailed pigeon, Patagioenas fasciata
Pale-vented pigeon, Patagioenas cayennensis
Plumbeous pigeon, Patagioenas plumbea
Ruddy pigeon, Patagioenas subvinacea
Ruddy quail-dove, Geotrygon montana
Violaceous quail-dove, Geotrygon violacea
White-tipped dove, Leptotila verreauxi
Gray-fronted dove, Leptotila rufaxilla
Large-tailed dove, Leptotila megalura
White-throated quail-dove, Zentrygon frenata
Eared dove, Zenaida auriculata
Blue ground dove, Claravis pretiosa
Long-tailed ground dove, Uropelia campestris
Maroon-chested ground dove, Paraclaravis mondetoura
Bare-faced ground dove, Metriopelia ceciliae
Black-winged ground dove, Metriopelia melanoptera
Golden-spotted ground dove, Metriopelia aymara
Plain-breasted ground dove, Columbina minuta
Ruddy ground dove, Columbina talpacoti
Scaled dove, Columbina squammata
Picui ground dove, Columbina picui

Cuckoos
Order: CuculiformesFamily: Cuculidae

The family Cuculidae includes cuckoos, roadrunners, and anis. These birds are of variable size with slender bodies, long tails, and strong legs.

Guira cuckoo, Guira guira
Greater ani, Crotophaga major
Smooth-billed ani, Crotophaga ani
Striped cuckoo, Tapera naevia
Pheasant cuckoo, Dromococcyx phasianellus
Pavonine cuckoo, Dromococcyx pavoninus
Rufous-vented ground-cuckoo, Neomorphus geoffroyi
Little cuckoo, Coccycua minuta
Ash-colored cuckoo, Coccycua cinerea
Squirrel cuckoo, Piaya cayana
Black-bellied cuckoo, Piaya melanogaster
Dark-billed cuckoo, Coccyzus melacoryphus
Yellow-billed cuckoo, Coccyzus americanus
Pearly-breasted cuckoo, Coccyzus euleri
Black-billed cuckoo, Coccyzus erythropthalmus

Oilbird
Order: SteatornithiformesFamily: Steatornithidae

The oilbird is a slim, long-winged bird related to the nightjars. It is nocturnal and a specialist feeder on the fruit of the oil palm.

Oilbird, Steatornis caripensis

Potoos
Order: NyctibiiformesFamily: Nyctibiidae

The potoos (sometimes called poor-me-ones) are large near passerine birds related to the nightjars and frogmouths. They are nocturnal insectivores which lack the bristles around the mouth found in the true nightjars.

Rufous potoo, Phyllaemulor bracteatus (H)
Great potoo, Nyctibius grandis
Long-tailed potoo, Nyctibius aethereus
Common potoo, Nyctibius griseus
Andean potoo, Nyctibius maculosus

Nightjars
Order: CaprimulgiformesFamily: Caprimulgidae

Nightjars are medium-sized nocturnal birds that usually nest on the ground. They have long wings, short legs, and very short bills. Most have small feet, of little use for walking, and long pointed wings. Their soft plumage is camouflaged to resemble bark or leaves.

Nacunda nighthawk, Chordeiles nacunda
Least nighthawk, Chordeiles pusillus
Sand-colored nighthawk, Chordeiles rupestris
Lesser nighthawk, Chordeiles acutipennis
Common nighthawk, Chordeiles minor
Short-tailed nighthawk, Lurocalis semitorquatus
Rufous-bellied nighthawk, Lurocalis rufiventris
Band-tailed nighthawk, Nyctiprogne leucopyga
Blackish nightjar, Nyctipolus nigrescens
Band-winged nightjar, Systellura longirostris
Common pauraque, Nyctidromus albicollis
White-winged nightjar, Eleothreptus candicans
Swallow-tailed nightjar, Uropsalis segmentata
Lyre-tailed nightjar, Uropsalis lyra
Little nightjar, Setopagis parvula
Spot-tailed nightjar, Hydropsalis maculicaudus
Ladder-tailed nightjar, Hydropsalis climacocerca
Scissor-tailed nightjar, Hydropsalis torquata
Ocellated poorwill, Nyctiphrynus ocellatus
Silky-tailed nightjar, Antrostomus sericocaudatus
Rufous nightjar, Antrostomus rufus

Swifts
Order: ApodiformesFamily: Apodidae

Swifts are small birds which spend the majority of their lives flying. These birds have very short legs and never settle voluntarily on the ground, perching instead only on vertical surfaces. Many swifts have long swept-back wings which resemble a crescent or boomerang.

White-chinned swift, Cypseloides cryptus (H)
White-chested swift, Cypseloides lemosi
Rothschild's swift, Cypseloides rothschildi
Great dusky swift, Cypseloides senex (H)
Chestnut-collared swift, Streptoprocne rutila
White-collared swift, Streptoprocne zonaris
Gray-rumped swift, Chaetura cinereiventris
Pale-rumped swift, Chaetura egregia
Chimney swift, Chaetura pelagica (H)
Chapman's swift, Chaetura chapmani
Sick's swift, Chaetura meridionalis
Short-tailed swift, Chaetura brachyura
White-tipped swift, Aeronautes montivagus
Andean swift, Aeronautes andecolus
Fork-tailed palm-swift, Tachornis squamata
Lesser swallow-tailed swift, Panyptila cayennensis

Hummingbirds
Order: ApodiformesFamily: Trochilidae

Hummingbirds are small birds capable of hovering in mid-air due to the rapid flapping of their wings. They are the only birds that can fly backwards.

White-necked jacobin, Florisuga mellivora
Buff-tailed sicklebill, Eutoxeres condamini
Rufous-breasted hermit, Glaucis hirsutus
Pale-tailed barbthroat, Threnetes leucurus
Cinnamon-throated hermit, Phaethornis nattereri
Reddish hermit, Phaethornis ruber
White-browed hermit, Phaethornis stuarti
Buff-bellied hermit, Phaethornis subochraceus
Planalto hermit, Phaethornis pretrei
White-bearded hermit, Phaethornis hispidus
Green hermit, Phaethornis guy (H)
Needle-billed hermit, Phaethornis philippii
Great-billed hermit, Phaethornis malaris
Green-fronted lancebill, Doryfera ludovicae
Geoffroy's daggerbill, Schistes geoffroyi
Brown violetear, Colibri delphinae
Lesser violetear, Colibri cyanotus
Sparkling violetear, Colibri coruscans
White-vented violetear, Colibri serrirostris
Horned sungem, Heliactin bilophus
Black-eared fairy, Heliothryx auritus
White-tailed goldenthroat, Polytmus guainumbi
Green-tailed goldenthroat, Polytmus theresiae
Ruby-topaz hummingbird, Chrysolampis mosquitus
Black-throated mango, Anthracothorax nigricollis
Amethyst-throated sunangel, Heliangelus amethysticollis
Wire-crested thorntail, Discosura popelairii (H)
Black-bellied thorntail, Discosura langsdorffi
Coppery thorntail, Discosura letitiae (E)
Dot-eared coquette, Lophornis gouldii (V)
Rufous-crested coquette, Lophornis delattrei
Butterfly coquette, Lophornis verreauxii
Speckled hummingbird, Adelomyia melanogenys
Long-tailed sylph, Aglaiocercus kingii
Red-tailed comet, Sappho sparganurus
Andean hillstar, Oreotrochilus estella
White-sided hillstar, Oreotrochilus leucopleurus
Wedge-tailed hillstar, Oreotrochilus adela
Green-tailed trainbearer, Lesbia nuna
Purple-backed thornbill, Ramphomicron microrhynchum
Rufous-capped thornbill, Chalcostigma ruficeps
Olivaceous thornbill, Chalcostigma olivaceum
Blue-mantled thornbill, Chalcostigma stanleyi
Tyrian metaltail, Metallura tyrianthina
Scaled metaltail, Metallura aeneocauda
Buff-thighed puffleg, Haplophaedia assimilis
Sapphire-vented puffleg, Eriocnemis luciani (H)
Blue-capped puffleg, Eriocnemis glaucopoides
Black-hooded sunbeam, Aglaeactis pamela (E)
Bronzy Inca, Coeligena coeligena
Collared Inca, Coeligena torquata
Violet-throated starfrontlet, Coeligena violifer
Sword-billed hummingbird, Ensifera ensifera
Great sapphirewing, Pterophanes cyanopterus
Booted racket-tail, Ocreatus underwoodii
Rufous-webbed brilliant, Heliodoxa branickii (H)
Gould's jewelfront, Heliodoxa aurescens
Fawn-breasted brilliant, Heliodoxa rubinoides (V)
Violet-fronted brilliant, Heliodoxa leadbeateri
Giant hummingbird, Patagona gigas
Long-billed starthroat, Heliomaster longirostris
Blue-tufted starthroat, Heliomaster furcifer
White-bellied woodstar, Chaetocercus mulsant
Slender-tailed woodstar, Microstilbon burmeisteri
Amethyst woodstar, Calliphlox amethystina
Blue-tailed emerald, Chlorostilbon mellisugus
Glittering-bellied emerald, Chlorostilbon lucidus
Violet-headed hummingbird, Klais guimeti
Gray-breasted sabrewing, Campylopterus largipennis
Swallow-tailed hummingbird, Eupetomena macroura
Fork-tailed woodnymph, Thalurania furcata
Many-spotted hummingbird, Taphrospilus hypostictus
Versicolored emerald, Chrysuronia versicolor
Golden-tailed sapphire, Chrysuronia oenone
Glittering-throated emerald, Chionomesa fimbriata
Sapphire-spangled emerald, Chionomesa lactea
Rufous-throated sapphire, Hylocharis sapphirina
Gilded hummingbird, Hylocharis chrysura
White-bellied hummingbird, Elliotomyia chionogaster
Green-and-white hummingbird, Elliotomyia viridicauda (H)
White-chinned sapphire, Chlorestes cyanus

Hoatzin
Order: OpisthocomiformesFamily: Opisthocomidae

The hoatzin is pheasant-sized, but much slimmer. It has a long tail and neck, but a small head with an unfeathered blue face and red eyes which are topped by a spiky crest. It is a weak flier which is found in the swamps of the Amazon and Orinoco rivers.

Hoatzin, Opisthocomus hoazin

Limpkin
Order: GruiformesFamily: Aramidae

The limpkin resembles a large rail. It has drab-brown plumage and a grayer head and neck.

Limpkin, Aramus guarauna

Trumpeters
Order: GruiformesFamily: Psophiidae

The trumpeters are dumpy birds with long necks and legs and chicken-like bills. They are named for the trumpeting call of the males.

Pale-winged trumpeter, Psophia leucoptera
Dark-winged trumpeter, Psophia viridis (H)

Rails
Order: GruiformesFamily: Rallidae

Rallidae is a large family of small to medium-sized birds which includes the rails, crakes, coots, and gallinules. Typically they inhabit dense vegetation in damp environments near lakes, swamps, or rivers. In general they are shy and secretive birds, making them difficult to observe. Most species have strong legs and long toes which are well adapted to soft uneven surfaces. They tend to have short rounded wings and to be weak fliers.

Purple gallinule, Porphyrio martinica
Azure gallinule, Porphyrio flavirostris
Chestnut-headed crake, Anurolimnas castaneiceps
Russet-crowned crake, Anurolimnas viridis
Rufous-sided crake, Laterallus melanophaius
Gray-breasted crake, Laterallus exilis
Rufous-faced crake, Laterallus xenopterus
Speckled rail, Coturnicops notatus (H)
Ocellated crake, Micropygia schomburgkii
Ash-throated crake, Mustelirallus albicollis
Paint-billed crake, Mustelirallus erythrops
Spotted rail, Pardirallus maculatus
Blackish rail, Pardirallus nigricans (H)
Plumbeous rail, Pardirallus sanguinolentus
Giant wood-rail, Aramides ypecaha
Gray-cowled wood-rail, Aramides cajaneus
Uniform crake, Amaurolimnas concolor
Spot-flanked gallinule, Porphyriops melanops
Yellow-breasted crake, Porzana flaviventer
Common gallinule, Gallinula galeata
Red-fronted coot, Fulica rufifrons
Horned coot, Fulica cornuta
Giant coot, Fulica gigantea
Red-gartered coot, Fulica armillata (H)
Slate-colored coot, Fulica ardesiaca
White-winged coot, Fulica leucoptera

Finfoots
Order: GruiformesFamily: Heliornithidae

Heliornithidae is a small family of tropical birds with webbed lobes on their feet similar to those of grebes and coots.

Sungrebe, Heliornis fulica

Plovers
Order: CharadriiformesFamily: Charadriidae

The family Charadriidae includes the plovers, dotterels, and lapwings. They are small to medium-sized birds with compact bodies, short, thick necks, and long, usually pointed, wings. They are found in open country worldwide, mostly in habitats near water.

American golden-plover, Pluvialis dominica
Black-bellied plover, Pluvialis squatarola (H)
Tawny-throated dotterel, Oreopholus ruficollis
Pied lapwing, Vanellus cayanus
Southern lapwing, Vanellus chilensis
Andean lapwing, Vanellus resplendens
Killdeer, Charadrius vociferus (H)
Semipalmated plover, Charadrius semipalmatus (V)
Collared plover, Charadrius collaris
Puna plover, Charadrius alticola
Diademed sandpiper-plover, Phegornis mitchellii

Avocets and stilts
Order: CharadriiformesFamily: Recurvirostridae

Recurvirostridae is a family of large wading birds, which includes the avocets and stilts. The avocets have long legs and long up-curved bills. The stilts have extremely long legs and long, thin, straight bills.

Black-necked stilt, Himantopus mexicanus
Andean avocet, Recurvirostra andina

Sandpipers
Order: CharadriiformesFamily: Scolopacidae

Scolopacidae is a large diverse family of small to medium-sized shorebirds including the sandpipers, curlews, godwits, shanks, tattlers, woodcocks, snipes, dowitchers, and phalaropes. The majority of these species eat small invertebrates picked out of the mud or soil. Variation in length of legs and bills enables multiple species to feed in the same habitat, particularly on the coast, without direct competition for food.

Upland sandpiper, Bartramia longicauda
Whimbrel, Numenius phaeopus (V)
Hudsonian godwit, Limosa haemastica
Ruddy turnstone, Arenaria interpres (V)
Red knot, Calidris canutus (H)
Sharp-tailed sandpiper, Calidris acuminata (V)
Stilt sandpiper, Calidris himantopus
Sanderling, Calidris alba (V)
Baird's sandpiper, Calidris bairdii
Least sandpiper, Calidris minutilla
White-rumped sandpiper, Calidris fuscicollis
Buff-breasted sandpiper, Calidris subruficollis
Pectoral sandpiper, Calidris melanotos
Jameson's snipe, Gallinago jamesoni
Giant snipe, Gallinago undulata
Pantanal snipe, Gallinago paraguaiae
Puna snipe, Gallinago andina
Wilson's phalarope, Phalaropus tricolor
Spotted sandpiper, Actitis macularia
Solitary sandpiper, Tringa solitaria
Greater yellowlegs, Tringa melanoleuca
Lesser yellowlegs, Tringa flavipes

Seedsnipes
Order: CharadriiformesFamily: Thinocoridae

The seedsnipes are a small family of birds that superficially resemble sparrows. They have short legs and long wings and are herbivorous waders.

Rufous-bellied seedsnipe, Attagis gayi
Gray-breasted seedsnipe, Thinocorus orbignyianus
Least seedsnipe, Thinocorus rumicivorus

Jacanas
Order: CharadriiformesFamily: Jacanidae

The jacanas are a family of waders found throughout the tropics. They are identifiable by their huge feet and claws which enable them to walk on floating vegetation in the shallow lakes that are their preferred habitat.

Wattled jacana, Jacana jacana

Skimmers
Order: CharadriiformesFamily: Rynchopidae

Skimmers are a small family of tropical tern-like birds. They have an elongated lower mandible which they use to feed by flying low over the water surface and skimming the water for small fish.

Black skimmer, Rynchops niger

Gulls
Order: CharadriiformesFamily: Laridae

Laridae is a family of medium to large seabirds and includes gulls, kittiwakes, and terns. Gulls are typically gray or white, often with black markings on the head or wings. They have longish bills and webbed feet. Terns are a group of generally medium to large seabirds typically with gray or white plumage, often with black markings on the head. Most terns hunt fish by diving but some pick insects off the surface of fresh water. Terns are generally long-lived birds, with several species known to live in excess of 30 years.

Andean gull, Chroicocephalus serranus
Laughing gull, Leucophaeus atricilla (V)
Franklin's gull, Leucophaeus pipixcan (V)
Yellow-billed tern, Sternula superciliaris
Large-billed tern, Phaetusa simplex
Common tern, Sterna hirundo (V)
Arctic tern, Sterna paradisaea (H)

Sunbittern
Order: EurypygiformesFamily: Eurypygidae

The sunbittern is a bittern-like bird of tropical regions of the Americas and the sole member of the family Eurypygidae (sometimes spelled Eurypigidae) and genus Eurypyga.

Sunbittern, Eurypyga helias

Storks
Order: CiconiiformesFamily: Ciconiidae

Storks are large, long-legged, long-necked wading birds with long, stout bills. Storks are mute, but bill-clattering is an important mode of communication at the nest. Their nests can be large and may be reused for many years. Many species are migratory.

Maguari stork, Ciconia maguari
Jabiru, Jabiru mycteria
Wood stork, Mycteria americana

Anhingas
Order: SuliformesFamily: Anhingidae

Anhingas are often called "snake-birds" because of their long thin neck, which gives a snake-like appearance when they swim with their bodies submerged. The males have black and dark-brown plumage, an erectile crest on the nape, and a larger bill than the female. The females have much paler plumage especially on the neck and underparts. The darters have completely webbed feet and their legs are short and set far back on the body. Their plumage is somewhat permeable, like that of cormorants, and they spread their wings to dry after diving.

Anhinga, Anhinga anhinga

Cormorants
Order: SuliformesFamily: Phalacrocoracidae

Phalacrocoracidae is a family of medium to large coastal, fish-eating seabirds that includes cormorants and shags. Plumage coloration varies, with the majority having mainly dark plumage, some species being black-and-white and a few being colorful.

Neotropic cormorant, Phalacrocorax brasilianus

Herons
Order: PelecaniformesFamily: Ardeidae

The family Ardeidae contains the bitterns, herons, and egrets. Herons and egrets are medium to large wading birds with long necks and legs. Bitterns tend to be shorter necked and more wary. Members of Ardeidae fly with their necks retracted, unlike other long-necked birds such as storks, ibises, and spoonbills.

Rufescent tiger-heron, Tigrisoma lineatum
Fasciated tiger-heron, Tigrisoma fasciatum
Agami heron, Agamia agami
Boat-billed heron, Cochlearius cochlearius
Zigzag heron, Zebrilus undulatus
Pinnated bittern, Botaurus pinnatus
Least bittern, Ixobrychus exilis
Stripe-backed bittern, Ixobrychus involucris
Black-crowned night-heron, Nycticorax nycticorax
Striated heron, Butorides striata
Cattle egret, Bubulcus ibis
Cocoi heron, Ardea cocoi
Great egret, Ardea alba
Whistling heron, Syrigma sibilatrix
Capped heron, Pilherodius pileatus
Snowy egret, Egretta thula
Little blue heron, Egretta caerulea

Ibises
Order: PelecaniformesFamily: Threskiornithidae

Threskiornithidae is a family of large terrestrial and wading birds which includes the ibises and spoonbills. They have long, broad wings with 11 primary and about 20 secondary feathers. They are strong fliers and despite their size and weight, very capable soarers.

White-faced ibis, Plegadis chihi
Puna ibis, Plegadis ridgwayi
Green ibis, Mesembrinibis cayennensis
Bare-faced ibis, Phimosus infuscatus
Plumbeous ibis, Theristicus caerulescens
Buff-necked ibis, Theristicus caudatus
Andean ibis, Theristicus branickii
Roseate spoonbill, Platalea ajaja

New World vultures
Order: CathartiformesFamily: Cathartidae

The New World vultures are not closely related to Old World vultures, but superficially resemble them because of convergent evolution. Like the Old World vultures, they are scavengers. However, unlike Old World vultures, which find carcasses by sight, New World vultures have a good sense of smell with which they locate carrion.

King vulture, Sarcoramphus papa
Andean condor, Vultur gryphus
Black vulture, Coragyps atratus
Turkey vulture, Cathartes aura
Lesser yellow-headed vulture, Cathartes burrovianus
Greater yellow-headed vulture, Cathartes melambrotus

Osprey
Order: AccipitriformesFamily: Pandionidae

The family Pandionidae contains only one species, the osprey. The osprey is a medium-large raptor which is a specialist fish-eater with a worldwide distribution.

Osprey, Pandion haliaetus

Hawks
Order: AccipitriformesFamily: Accipitridae

Accipitridae is a family of birds of prey, which includes hawks, eagles, kites, harriers, and Old World vultures. These birds have powerful hooked beaks for tearing flesh from their prey, strong legs, powerful talons, and keen eyesight.

Pearl kite, Gampsonyx swainsonii
White-tailed kite, Elanus leucurus
Hook-billed kite, Chondrohierax uncinatus
Gray-headed kite, Leptodon cayanensis
Swallow-tailed kite, Elanoides forficatus
Crested eagle, Morphnus guianensis
Harpy eagle, Harpia harpyja
Black hawk-eagle, Spizaetus tyrannus
Ornate hawk-eagle, Spizaetus ornatus
Black-and-white hawk-eagle, Spizaetus melanoleucus
Black-and-chestnut eagle, Spizaetus isidori
Black-collared hawk, Busarellus nigricollis
Snail kite, Rostrhamus sociabilis
Slender-billed kite, Helicolestes hamatus
Double-toothed kite, Harpagus bidentatus
Rufous-thighed kite, Harpagus diodon
Mississippi kite, Ictinia mississippiensis
Plumbeous kite, Ictinia plumbea
Cinereous harrier, Circus cinereus
Long-winged harrier, Circus buffoni
Gray-bellied hawk, Accipiter poliogaster
Sharp-shinned hawk, Accipiter striatus
Bicolored hawk, Accipiter bicolor
Tiny hawk, Microspizias superciliosus
Semicollared hawk, Microspizias collaris
Crane hawk, Geranospiza caerulescens
Slate-colored hawk, Buteogallus schistaceus
Savanna hawk, Buteogallus meridionalis
Great black hawk, Buteogallus urubitinga
Solitary eagle, Buteogallus solitarius
Chaco eagle, Buteogallus coronatus
Roadside hawk, Rupornis magnirostris
Harris's hawk, Parabuteo unicinctus
White-rumped hawk, Parabuteo leucorrhous
White-tailed hawk, Geranoaetus albicaudatus
Variable hawk, Geranoaetus polyosoma
Black-chested buzzard-eagle, Geranoaetus melanoleucus
White hawk, Pseudastur albicollis
White-browed hawk, Leucopternis kuhli
Gray-lined hawk, Buteo nitidus
Broad-winged hawk, Buteo platypterus
White-throated hawk, Buteo albigula
Short-tailed hawk, Buteo brachyurus
Swainson's hawk, Buteo swainsoni
Zone-tailed hawk, Buteo albonotatus

Barn owls
Order: StrigiformesFamily: Tytonidae

Barn owls are medium to large owls with large heads and characteristic heart-shaped faces. They have long strong legs with powerful talons.

Barn owl, Tyto alba

Owls
Order: StrigiformesFamily: Strigidae

The typical owls are small to large solitary nocturnal birds of prey. They have large forward-facing eyes and ears, a hawk-like beak, and a conspicuous circle of feathers around each eye called a facial disk.

White-throated screech-owl, Megascops albogularis
Tropical screech-owl, Megascops choliba
Rufescent screech-owl, Megascops ingens
Cloud-forest screech-owl, Megascops marshalli
Montane forest screech-owl, Megascops hoyi
Foothill screech-owl, Megascops roraimae
Tawny-bellied screech-owl, Megascops watsonii
Crested owl, Lophostrix cristata
Spectacled owl, Pulsatrix perspicillata
Band-bellied owl, Pulsatrix melanota
Great horned owl, Bubo virginianus
Chaco owl, Strix chacoensis
Mottled owl, Strix virgata
Black-banded owl, Strix huhula
Rufous-banded owl, Strix albitarsus
Yungas pygmy-owl, Glaucidium bolivianum
Subtropical pygmy-owl, Glaucidium parkeri
Amazonian pygmy-owl, Glaucidium hardyi
Ferruginous pygmy-owl, Glaucidium brasilianum
Burrowing owl, Athene cunicularia
Buff-fronted owl, Aegolius harrisii
Striped owl, Asio clamator
Stygian owl, Asio stygius
Short-eared owl, Asio flammeus

Trogons
Order: TrogoniformesFamily: Trogonidae

The family Trogonidae includes trogons and quetzals. Found in tropical woodlands worldwide, they feed on insects and fruit, and their broad bills and weak legs reflect their diet and arboreal habits. Although their flight is fast, they are reluctant to fly any distance. Trogons have soft, often colorful, feathers with distinctive male and female plumage.

Pavonine quetzal, Pharomachrus pavoninus
Golden-headed quetzal, Pharomachrus auriceps
Crested quetzal, Pharomachrus antisianus
Black-tailed trogon, Trogon melanurus
Green-backed trogon, Trogon viridis
Amazonian trogon, Trogon ramonianus
Blue-crowned trogon, Trogon curucui
Black-throated trogon, Trogon rufus (see note)
Collared trogon, Trogon collaris
Masked trogon, Trogon personatus

Motmots
Order: CoraciiformesFamily: Momotidae

The motmots have colorful plumage and long, graduated tails which they display by waggling back and forth. In most of the species, the barbs near the ends of the two longest (central) tail feathers are weak and fall off, leaving a length of bare shaft and creating a racket-shaped tail.

Broad-billed motmot, Electron platyrhynchum
Rufous motmot, Baryphthengus martii
Amazonian motmot, Momotus momota
Andean motmot, Momotus aequatorialis

Kingfishers
Order: CoraciiformesFamily: Alcedinidae

Kingfishers are medium-sized birds with large heads, long pointed bills, short legs, and stubby tails.

Ringed kingfisher, Megaceryle torquatus
Amazon kingfisher, Chloroceryle amazona
American pygmy kingfisher, Chloroceryle aenea
Green kingfisher, Chloroceryle americana
Green-and-rufous kingfisher, Chloroceryle inda

Jacamars
Order: GalbuliformesFamily: Galbulidae

The jacamars are near passerine birds from tropical South America, with a range that extends up to Mexico. They feed on insects caught on the wing, and are glossy, elegant birds with long bills and tails. In appearance and behavior they resemble the Old World bee-eaters, although they are more closely related to puffbirds.

Purus jacamar, Galbalcyrhynchus purusianus
White-throated jacamar, Brachygalba albogularis
Brown jacamar, Brachygalba lugubris
Blue-cheeked jacamar, Galbula cyanicollis
Rufous-tailed jacamar, Galbula ruficauda
Bluish-fronted jacamar, Galbula cyanescens
Bronzy jacamar, Galbula leucogastra
Paradise jacamar, Galbula dea
Great jacamar, Jacamerops aureus

Puffbirds
Order: GalbuliformesFamily: Bucconidae

The puffbirds are related to the jacamars and have the same range, but lack the iridescent colors of that family. They are mainly brown, rufous, or gray, with large heads and flattened bills with hooked tips. The loose abundant plumage and short tails makes them look stout and puffy, giving rise to the English common name of the family.

White-necked puffbird, Notharchus hyperrhynchus
Brown-banded puffbird, Notharchus ordii
Pied puffbird, Notharchus tectus
Chestnut-capped puffbird, Bucco macrodactylus
Spotted puffbird, Bucco tamatia
Collared puffbird, Bucco capensis
Western striolated-puffbird, Nystalus obamais
Eastern striolated-puffbird, Nystalus striolatus
White-eared puffbird, Nystalus chacuru
Spot-backed puffbird, Nystalus maculatus
Semicollared puffbird, Malacoptila semicincta
Rufous-necked puffbird, Malacoptila rufa
Black-streaked puffbird, Malacoptila fulvogularis
Lanceolated monklet, Micromonacha lanceolata
Fulvous-chinned nunlet, Nonnula sclateri
Rufous-capped nunlet, Nonnula ruficapilla
Black-fronted nunbird, Monasa nigrifrons
White-fronted nunbird, Monasa morphoeus
Yellow-billed nunbird, Monasa flavirostris
Swallow-winged puffbird, Chelidoptera tenebrosa

New World barbets
Order: PiciformesFamily: Capitonidae

The barbets are plump birds, with short necks and large heads. They get their name from the bristles which fringe their heavy bills. Most species are brightly colored.

Black-girdled barbet, Capito dayi
Gilded barbet, Capito auratus
Lemon-throated barbet, Eubucco richardsoni
Scarlet-hooded barbet, Eubucco tucinkae
Versicolored barbet, Eubucco versicolor

Toucans
Order: PiciformesFamily: Ramphastidae

Toucans are near passerine birds from the Neotropics. They are brightly marked and have enormous colorful bills which in some species amount to half their body length.

Toco toucan, Ramphastos toco
White-throated toucan, Ramphastos tucanus
Channel-billed toucan, Ramphastos vitellinus
Southern emerald-toucanet, Aulacorhynchus albivitta
Chestnut-tipped toucanet, Aulacorhynchus derbianus
Blue-banded toucanet, Aulacorhynchus coeruleicinctis
Hooded mountain-toucan, Andigena cucullata
Golden-collared toucanet, Selenidera reinwardtii
Gould's toucanet, Selenidera gouldii
Lettered aracari, Pteroglossus inscriptus
Chestnut-eared aracari, Pteroglossus castanotis
Ivory-billed aracari, Pteroglossus azara
Curl-crested aracari, Pteroglossus beauharnaisii
Red-necked aracari, Pteroglossus bitorquatus

Woodpeckers
Order: PiciformesFamily: Picidae

Woodpeckers are small to medium-sized birds with chisel-like beaks, short legs, stiff tails, and long tongues used for capturing insects. Some species have feet with two toes pointing forward and two backward, while several species have only three toes. Many woodpeckers have the habit of tapping noisily on tree trunks with their beaks.

Bar-breasted piculet, Picumnus aurifrons
White-barred piculet, Picumnus cirratus
Ocellated piculet, Picumnus dorbignyanus
White-wedged piculet, Picumnus albosquamatus
Rusty-necked piculet, Picumnus fuscus
Rufous-breasted piculet, Picumnus rufiventris
White woodpecker, Melanerpes candidus
Yellow-tufted woodpecker, Melanerpes cruentatus
White-fronted woodpecker, Melanerpes cactorum
Smoky-brown woodpecker, Dryobates fumigatus
Checkered woodpecker, Dryobates mixtus
Striped woodpecker, Dryobates lignarius
Little woodpecker, Dryobates passerinus
Dot-fronted woodpecker, Dryobates frontalis
Bar-bellied woodpecker, Dryobates nigriceps
Red-stained woodpecker, Dryobates affinis
Crimson-bellied woodpecker, Campephilus haematogaster
Red-necked woodpecker, Campephilus rubricollis
Crimson-crested woodpecker, Campephilus melanoleucos
Cream-backed woodpecker, Campephilus leucopogon
Lineated woodpecker, Dryocopus lineatus
Black-bodied woodpecker, Dryocopus schulzi
Ringed woodpecker, Celeus torquatus
Scale-breasted woodpecker, Celeus grammicus
Cream-colored woodpecker, Celeus flavus
Rufous-headed woodpecker, Celeus spectabilis
Chestnut woodpecker, Celeus elegans
Pale-crested woodpecker, Celeus lugubris
White-throated woodpecker, Piculus leucolaemus
Yellow-throated woodpecker, Piculus flavigula
Golden-green woodpecker, Piculus chrysochloros
Golden-olive woodpecker, Colaptes rubiginosus
Crimson-mantled woodpecker, Colaptes rivolii
Spot-breasted woodpecker, Colaptes punctigula
Green-barred woodpecker, Colaptes melanochloros
Andean flicker, Colaptes rupicola
Campo flicker, Colaptes campestris

Seriemas
Order: CariamiformesFamily: Cariamidae

The seriemas are terrestrial birds which run rather than fly (though they are able to fly for short distances). They have long legs, necks, and tails, but only short wings, reflecting their way of life. They are brownish birds with short bills and erectile crests and are found on fairly dry open grasslands.

Red-legged seriema, Cariama cristata
Black-legged seriema, Chunga burmeisteri

Falcons
Order: FalconiformesFamily: Falconidae

Falconidae is a family of diurnal birds of prey. They differ from hawks, eagles, and kites in that they kill with their beaks instead of their talons.

Laughing falcon, Herpetotheres cachinnans
Barred forest-falcon, Micrastur ruficollis
Lined forest-falcon, Micrastur gilvicollis
Cryptic forest-falcon, Micrastur mintoni
Slaty-backed forest-falcon, Micrastur mirandollei
Collared forest-falcon, Micrastur semitorquatus
Spot-winged falconet, Spiziapteryx circumcincta
Crested caracara, Caracara plancus
Red-throated caracara, Ibycter americanus
Mountain caracara, Phalcoboenus megalopterus
Black caracara, Daptrius ater
Yellow-headed caracara, Milvago chimachima
Chimango caracara, Milvago chimango
American kestrel, Falco sparverius
Bat falcon, Falco rufigularis
Orange-breasted falcon, Falco deiroleucus
Aplomado falcon, Falco femoralis
Peregrine falcon, Falco peregrinus

New World and African parrots
Order: PsittaciformesFamily: Psittacidae

Parrots are small to large birds with a characteristic curved beak. Their upper mandibles have slight mobility in the joint with the skull and they have a generally erect stance. All parrots are zygodactyl, having the four toes on each foot placed two at the front and two to the back.

Scarlet-shouldered parrotlet, Touit huetii
Gray-hooded parakeet, Psilopsiagon aymara
Mountain parakeet, Psilopsiagon aurifrons
Barred parakeet, Bolborhynchus lineola
Andean parakeet, Bolborhynchus orbygnesius
Amazonian parrotlet, Nannopsittaca dachilleae
Monk parakeet, Myiopsitta monachus
Tui parakeet, Brotogeris sanctithomae
Yellow-chevroned parakeet, Brotogeris chiriri
Cobalt-winged parakeet, Brotogeris cyanoptera
Golden-winged parakeet, Brotogeris chrysoptera
Black-winged parrot, Hapalopsittaca melanotis
Orange-cheeked parrot, Pyrilia barrabandi
Red-billed parrot, Pionus sordidus
Scaly-headed parrot, Pionus maximiliani
Speckle-faced parrot, Pionus tumultuosus
Blue-headed parrot, Pionus menstruus
Yellow-faced parrot, Alipiopsitta xanthops
Festive parrot, Amazona festiva (H)
Tucuman parrot, Amazona tucumana
Yellow-crowned parrot, Amazona ochrocephala
Turquoise-fronted parrot, Amazona aestiva
Mealy parrot, Amazona farinosa
Orange-winged parrot, Amazona amazonica
Scaly-naped parrot, Amazona mercenarius
Dusky-billed parrotlet, Forpus modestus
Cobalt-rumped parrotlet, Forpus xanthopterygius
White-bellied parrot, Pionites leucogaster
Crimson-bellied parakeet, Pyrrhura perlata
Green-cheeked parakeet, Pyrrhura molinae
Santarem parakeet, Pyrrhura amazonum
Rose-fronted parakeet, Pyrrhura roseifrons
Black-capped parakeet, Pyrrhura rupicola
Hyacinth macaw, Anodorhynchus hyacinthinus
Peach-fronted parakeet, Eupsittula aurea
Dusky-headed parakeet, Aratinga weddellii
Nanday parakeet, Aratinga nenday
Red-bellied macaw, Orthopsittaca manilatus
Blue-winged macaw, Primolius maracana
Blue-headed macaw, Primolius couloni
Yellow-collared macaw, Primolius auricollis
Blue-and-yellow macaw, Ara ararauna
Blue-throated macaw, Ara glaucogularis (E)
Chestnut-fronted macaw, Ara severus
Red-fronted macaw, Ara rubrogenys (E)
Military macaw, Ara militaris
Scarlet macaw, Ara macao
Red-and-green macaw, Ara chloropterus
Blue-crowned parakeet, Thectocercus acuticaudatus
Red-shouldered macaw, Diopsittaca nobilis
Mitred parakeet, Psittacara mitratus
White-eyed parakeet, Psittacara leucophthalmus

Antbirds
Order: PasseriformesFamily: Thamnophilidae

The antbirds are a large family of small passerine birds of subtropical and tropical Central and South America. They are forest birds which tend to feed on insects at or near the ground. A sizable minority of them specialize in following columns of army ants to eat small invertebrates that leave their hiding places to flee from the ants. Many species lack bright color; brown, black, and white are the dominant tones.

Chestnut-shouldered antwren, Euchrepomis humeralis
Yellow-rumped antwren, Euchrepomis sharpei
Fasciated antshrike, Cymbilaimus lineatus
Bamboo antshrike, Cymbilaimus sanctaemariae
Giant antshrike, Batara cinerea
Undulated antshrike, Frederickena unduliger (H)
Great antshrike, Taraba major
Barred antshrike, Thamnophilus doliatus
Rufous-capped antshrike, Thamnophilus ruficapillus
Rufous-winged antshrike, Thamnophilus torquatus
Chestnut-backed antshrike, Thamnophilus palliatus
Plain-winged antshrike, Thamnophilus schistaceus
Mouse-colored antshrike, Thamnophilus murinus
Natterer's slaty-antshrike, Thamnophilus stictocephalus
Bolivian slaty-antshrike, Thamnophilus sticturus
Variable antshrike, Thamnophilus caerulescens
White-shouldered antshrike, Thamnophilus aethiops
Upland antshrike, Thamnophilus aroyae
Amazonian antshrike, Thamnophilus amazonicus
Rufescent antshrike, Thamnistes rufescens
Plain antvireo, Dysithamnus mentalis
Black-capped antwren, Herpsilochmus atricapillus
Large-billed antwren, Herpsilochmus longirostris
Yellow-breasted antwren, Herpsilochmus axillaris
Rufous-margined antwren, Herpsilochmus frater
Dusky-throated antshrike, Thamnomanes ardesiacus
Saturnine antshrike, Thamnomanes saturninus
Cinereous antshrike, Thamnomanes caesius
Bluish-slate antshrike, Thamnomanes schistogynus
Plain-throated antwren, Isleria hauxwelli
Ornate stipplethroat, Epinecrophylla ornata
White-eyed stipplethroat, Epinecrophylla leucophthalma
Rio Madeira stipplethroat, Epinecrophylla amazonica
Pygmy antwren, Myrmotherula brachyura
Sclater's antwren, Myrmotherula sclateri
Amazonian streaked-antwren, Myrmotherula multostriata
Stripe-chested antwren, Myrmotherula longicauda
White-flanked antwren, Myrmotherula axillaris
Long-winged antwren, Myrmotherula longipennis
Ihering's antwren, Myrmotherula iheringi
Ashy antwren, Myrmotherula grisea
Gray antwren, Myrmotherula menetriesii
Leaden antwren, Myrmotherula assimilis
Banded antbird, Dichrozona cincta
Stripe-backed antbird, Myrmorchilus strigilatus
Dot-winged antwren, Microrhopias quixensis
White-fringed antwren, Formicivora grisea
Black-bellied antwren, Formicivora melanogaster
Rusty-backed antwren, Formicivora rufa
Striated antbird, Drymophila devillei
Streak-headed antbird, Drymophila striaticeps
Peruvian warbling-antbird, Hypocnemis peruviana
Yellow-breasted warbling-antbird, Hypocnemis subflava
Rondonia warbling-antbird, Hypocnemis ochrogyna
Black antbird, Cercomacroides serva
Blackish antbird, Cercomacroides nigrescens
Riparian antbird, Cercomacroides fuscicauda
Manu antbird, Cercomacra manu
Gray antbird, Cercomacra cinerascens
Mato Grosso antbird, Cercomacra melanaria
Western fire-eye, Pyriglena maura
White-browed antbird, Myrmoborus leucophrys
Black-faced antbird, Myrmoborus myotherinus
White-lined antbird, Myrmoborus lophotes
Band-tailed antbird, Hypocnemoides maculicauda
Black-and-white antbird, Myrmochanes hemileucus
Silvered antbird, Sclateria naevia
Plumbeous antbird, Myrmelastes hyperythrus
Spot-winged antbird, Myrmelastes leucostigma
Humaita antbird, Myrmelastes humaythae
Brownish-headed antbird, Myrmelastes brunneiceps
Chestnut-tailed antbird, Sciaphylax hemimelaena
Goeldi's antbird, Akletos goeldii
Sooty antbird, Hafferia fortis
Black-throated antbird, Myrmophylax atrothorax
White-throated antbird, Oncillornis salvini
Hairy-crested antbird, Rhegmatorhina melanosticta
Spot-backed antbird, Hylophylax naevius
Dot-backed antbird, Hylophylax punctulatus
Common scale-backed antbird, Willisornis poecilinotus
Black-spotted bare-eye, Phlegopsis nigromaculata
Reddish-winged bare-eye, Phlegopsis erythroptera

Crescentchests
Order: PasseriformesFamily: Melanopareiidae

These are smallish birds which inhabit regions of arid scrub. They have a band across the chest which gives them their name.

Collared crescentchest, Melanopareia torquata
Olive-crowned crescentchest, Melanopareia maximiliani

Gnateaters
Order: PasseriformesFamily: Conopophagidae

The gnateaters are round, short-tailed, and long-legged birds which are closely related to the antbirds.

Ash-throated gnateater, Conopophaga peruviana
Slaty gnateater, Conopophaga ardesiaca

Antpittas
Order: PasseriformesFamily: Grallariidae

Antpittas resemble the true pittas with strong longish legs, very short tails, and stout bills.

Undulated antpitta, Grallaria squamigera
Scaled antpitta, Grallaria guatimalensis
Stripe-headed antpitta, Grallaria andicolus
White-throated antpitta, Grallaria albigula
Bolivian antpitta, Grallaria cochabambae (E)
Puno antpitta, Grallaria sinaensis
Rufous-faced antpitta, Grallaria erythrotis
Ochre-breasted antpitta, Grallaricula flavirostris
Leymebamba antpitta, Grallaricula leymebambae
Masked antpitta, Hylopezus auricularis (E)
Amazonian antpitta, Myrmothera berlepschi
Thrush-like antpitta, Myrmothera campanisona

Tapaculos
Order: PasseriformesFamily: Rhinocryptidae

The tapaculos are small suboscine passeriform birds with numerous species in South and Central America. They are terrestrial species that fly only poorly on their short wings. They have strong legs, well-suited to their habitat of grassland or forest undergrowth. The tail is cocked and pointed towards the head.

Rusty-belted tapaculo, Liosceles thoracicus
Crested gallito, Rhinocrypta lanceolata
Zimmer's tapaculo, Scytalopus zimmeri
Puna tapaculo, Scytalopus simonsi
Diademed tapaculo, Scytalopus schulenbergi
Trilling tapaculo, Scytalopus parvirostris
Bolivian tapaculo, Scytalopus bolivianus

Antthrushes
Order: PasseriformesFamily: Formicariidae

Antthrushes resemble small rails with strong, longish legs, very short tails, and stout bills.

Rufous-capped antthrush, Formicarius colma
Black-faced antthrush, Formicarius analis
Rufous-fronted antthrush, Formicarius rufifrons
Short-tailed antthrush, Chamaeza campanisona
Striated antthrush, Chamaeza nobilis
Barred antthrush, Chamaeza mollissima

Ovenbirds
Order: PasseriformesFamily: Furnariidae

Ovenbirds comprise a large family of small sub-oscine passerine bird species found in Central and South America. They are a diverse group of insectivores which gets its name from the elaborate "oven-like" clay nests built by some species, although others build stick nests or nest in tunnels or clefts in rock. The woodcreepers are brownish birds which maintain an upright vertical posture, supported by their stiff tail vanes. They feed mainly on insects taken from tree trunks.

South American leaftosser, Sclerurus obscurior
Short-billed leaftosser, Sclerurus rufigularis
Black-tailed leaftosser, Sclerurus caudacutus
Gray-throated leaftosser, Sclerurus albigularis
Slender-billed miner, Geositta tenuirostris
Common miner, Geositta cunicularia
Puna miner, Geositta punensis
Campo miner, Geositta poeciloptera
Rufous-banded miner, Geositta rufipennis
Olivaceous woodcreeper, Sittasomus griseicapillus
Long-tailed woodcreeper, Deconychura longicauda
Tyrannine woodcreeper, Dendrocincla tyrannina
White-chinned woodcreeper, Dendrocincla merula
Plain-brown woodcreeper, Dendrocincla fuliginosa
Wedge-billed woodcreeper, Glyphorynchus spirurus
Cinnamon-throated woodcreeper, Dendrexetastes rufigula
Long-billed woodcreeper, Nasica longirostris
Amazonian barred-woodcreeper, Dendrocolaptes certhia
Black-banded woodcreeper, Dendrocolaptes picumnus
Bar-bellied woodcreeper, Hylexetastes stresemanni
Uniform woodcreeper, Hylexetastes uniformis
Strong-billed woodcreeper, Xiphocolaptes promeropirhynchus
Great rufous woodcreeper, Xiphocolaptes major
Striped woodcreeper, Xiphorhynchus obsoletus
Ocellated woodcreeper, Xiphorhynchus ocellatus
Elegant woodcreeper, Xiphorhynchus elegans
Buff-throated woodcreeper, Xiphorhynchus guttatus
Olive-backed woodcreeper, Xiphorhynchus triangularis
Straight-billed woodcreeper, Dendroplex picus
Red-billed scythebill, Campylorhamphus trochilirostris
Scimitar-billed woodcreeper, Drymornis bridgesii
Narrow-billed woodcreeper, Lepidocolaptes angustirostris
Montane woodcreeper, Lepidocolaptes lacrymiger
Inambari woodcreeper, Lepidocolaptes fatimalimae
Dusky-capped woodcreeper, Lepidocolaptes fuscicapillus
Slender-billed xenops, Xenops tenuirostris
Plain xenops, Xenops minutus
Streaked xenops, Xenops rutilans
Point-tailed palmcreeper, Berlepschia rikeri
Rufous-tailed xenops, Microxenops milleri
Rock earthcreeper, Ochetorhynchus andaecola
Straight-billed earthcreeper, Ochetorhynchus ruficaudus
Streaked tuftedcheek, Pseudocolaptes boissonneautii
Bolivian earthcreeper, Tarphonomus harterti
Chaco earthcreeper, Tarphonomus certhioides
Pale-legged hornero, Furnarius leucopus
Rufous hornero, Furnarius rufus
Crested hornero, Furnarius cristatus
Sharp-tailed streamcreeper, Lochmias nematura
Wren-like rushbird, Phleocryptes melanops
Scale-throated earthcreeper, Upucerthia dumetaria
Buff-breasted earthcreeper, Upucerthia validirostris
Cream-winged cinclodes, Cinclodes albiventris
Royal cinclodes, Cinclodes aricomae
White-winged cinclodes, Cinclodes atacamensis
Dusky-cheeked foliage-gleaner, Anabazenops dorsalis
Rufous-rumped foliage-gleaner, Philydor erythrocercum
Cinnamon-rumped foliage-gleaner, Philydor pyrrhodes
Montane foliage-gleaner, Anabacerthia striaticollis
Rufous-tailed foliage-gleaner, Anabacerthia ruficaudata
Buff-browed foliage-gleaner, Syndactyla rufosuperciliata
Peruvian recurvebill, Syndactyla ucayalae
Bolivian recurvebill, Syndactyla striata
Chestnut-winged hookbill, Ancistrops strigilatus
Buff-fronted foliage-gleaner, Dendroma rufa
Chestnut-winged foliage-gleaner, Dendroma erythroptera
Ruddy foliage-gleaner, Clibanornis rubiginosus
Rufous-backed treehunter, Thripadectes scrutator
Striped treehunter, Thripadectes holostictus
Chestnut-crowned foliage-gleaner, Automolus rufipileatus
Brown-rumped foliage-gleaner, Automolus melanopezus
Buff-throated foliage-gleaner, Automolus ochrolaemus
Striped woodhaunter, Automolus subulatus
Olive-backed foliage-gleaner, Automolus infuscatus
Spotted barbtail, Premnoplex brunnescens
Pearled treerunner, Margarornis squamiger
Tawny tit-spinetail, Sylviorthorhynchus yanacensis
Brown-capped tit-spinetail, Leptasthenura fuliginiceps
Plain-mantled tit-spinetail, Leptasthenura aegithaloides
Andean tit-spinetail, Leptasthenura andicola
Rufous-fronted thornbird, Phacellodomus rufifrons
Streak-fronted thornbird, Phacellodomus striaticeps
Little thornbird, Phacellodomus sibilatrix
Spot-breasted thornbird, Phacellodomus maculipectus
Greater thornbird, Phacellodomus ruber
Lark-like brushrunner, Coryphistera alaudina
Creamy-breasted canastero, Asthenes dorbignyi
Berlepsch's canastero, Asthenes berlepschi (E)
Short-billed canastero, Asthenes baeri
Line-fronted canastero, Asthenes urubambensis
Scribble-tailed canastero, Asthenes maculicauda
Streak-backed canastero, Asthenes wyatti
Puna canastero, Asthenes sclateri
Streak-throated canastero, Asthenes humilis
Cordilleran canastero, Asthenes modesta
Sharp-billed canastero, Asthenes pyrrholeuca
Black-throated thistletail, Asthenes harterti (E)
Puna thistletail, Asthenes helleri
Maquis canastero, Asthenes heterura
Orange-fronted plushcrown, Metopothrix aurantiaca
Plain softtail, Thripophaga fusciceps
Light-crowned spinetail, Cranioleuca albiceps
Rusty-backed spinetail, Cranioleuca vulpina
Parker's spinetail, Cranioleuca vulpecula
Stripe-crowned spinetail, Cranioleuca pyrrhophia
Bolivian spinetail, Cranioleuca henricae (E)
Ash-browed spinetail, Cranioleuca curtata
Speckled spinetail, Cranioleuca gutturata
Rufous cacholote, Pseudoseisura unirufa
Brown cacholote, Pseudoseisura lophotes
Yellow-chinned spinetail, Certhiaxis cinnamomeus
White-bellied spinetail, Mazaria propinqua
Chotoy spinetail, Schoeniophylax phryganophilus
Ochre-cheeked spinetail, Synallaxis scutata
Sooty-fronted spinetail, Synallaxis frontalis
Azara's spinetail, Synallaxis azarae
Pale-breasted spinetail, Synallaxis albescens
Dark-breasted spinetail, Synallaxis albigularis
Cinereous-breasted spinetail, Synallaxis hypospodia
Ruddy spinetail, Synallaxis rutilans
Chestnut-throated spinetail, Synallaxis cherriei
Cabanis's spinetail, Synallaxis cabanisi
Plain-crowned spinetail, Synallaxis gujanensis
White-lored spinetail, Synallaxis albilora

Manakins
Order: PasseriformesFamily: Pipridae

The manakins are a family of subtropical and tropical mainland Central and South America, and Trinidad and Tobago. They are compact forest birds, the males typically being brightly colored, although the females of most species are duller and usually green-plumaged. Manakins feed on small fruits, berries and insects.

Dwarf tyrant-manakin, Tyranneutes stolzmanni
Pale-bellied tyrant-manakin, Neopelma pallescens
Sulphur-bellied tyrant-manakin, Neopelma sulphureiventer
Jet manakin, Chloropipo unicolor
Helmeted manakin, Antilophia galeata
Blue-backed manakin, Chiroxiphia pareola
Yungas manakin, Chiroxiphia boliviana
Black manakin, Xenopipo atronitens
Blue-capped manakin, Lepidothrix coronata
Snow-capped manakin, Lepidothrix nattereri
Flame-crowned manakin, Heterocercus linteatus
White-bearded manakin, Manacus manacus
Band-tailed manakin, Pipra fasciicauda
Fiery-capped manakin, Machaeropterus pyrocephalus
Red-headed manakin, Ceratopipra rubrocapilla
Round-tailed manakin, Ceratopipra chloromeros

Cotingas
Order: PasseriformesFamily: Cotingidae

The cotingas are birds of forests or forest edges in tropical South America. Comparatively little is known about this diverse group, although all have broad bills with hooked tips, rounded wings, and strong legs. The males of many of the species are brightly colored or decorated with plumes or wattles.

Band-tailed fruiteater, Pipreola intermedia
Barred fruiteater, Pipreola arcuata
Scarlet-breasted fruiteater, Pipreola frontalis
Scaled fruiteater, Ampelioides tschudii
White-tipped plantcutter, Phytotoma rutila
Swallow-tailed cotinga, Phibalura flavirostris
Red-crested cotinga, Ampelion rubrocristatus
Chestnut-crested cotinga, Ampelion rufaxilla
Andean cock-of-the-rock, Rupicola peruvianus
Purple-throated fruitcrow, Querula purpurata
Amazonian umbrellabird, Cephalopterus ornatus
Plum-throated cotinga, Cotinga maynana
Spangled cotinga, Cotinga cayana
Screaming piha, Lipaugus vociferans
Scimitar-winged piha, Lipaugus uropygialis
Purple-throated cotinga, Porphyrolaema porphyrolaema (H)
Pompadour cotinga, Xipholena punicea
Bare-necked fruitcrow, Gymnoderus foetidus
Black-faced cotinga, Conioptilon mcilhennyi

Tityras
Order: PasseriformesFamily: Tityridae

Tityridae are suboscine passerine birds found in forest and woodland in the Neotropics. The species in this family were formerly spread over the families Tyrannidae, Pipridae, and Cotingidae. They are small to medium-sized birds. They do not have the sophisticated vocal capabilities of the songbirds. Most, but not all, have plain coloring.

Black-crowned tityra, Tityra inquisitor
Black-tailed tityra, Tityra cayana
Masked tityra, Tityra semifasciata
Varzea schiffornis, Schiffornis major
Brown-winged schiffornis, Schiffornis turdina
Cinereous mourner, Laniocera hypopyrra
White-browed purpletuft, Iodopleura isabellae
Shrike-like cotinga, Laniisoma elegans
White-naped xenopsaris, Xenopsaris albinucha
Green-backed becard, Pachyramphus viridis
Barred becard, Pachyramphus versicolor
Chestnut-crowned becard, Pachyramphus castaneus
White-winged becard, Pachyramphus polychopterus
Black-capped becard, Pachyramphus marginatus
Pink-throated becard, Pachyramphus minor
Crested becard, Pachyramphus validus

Sharpbill
Order: PasseriformesFamily: Oxyruncidae

The sharpbill is a small bird of dense forests in Central and South America. It feeds mostly on fruit but also eats insects.

Sharpbill, Oxyruncus cristatus

Royal flycatchers
Order: PasseriformesFamily: Onychorhynchidae

In 2019 the SACC determined that these species, which were formerly considered tyrant flycatchers, belonged in their own family.

Royal flycatcher, Onychorhynchus coronatus
Ruddy-tailed flycatcher, Terenotriccus erythrurus
Tawny-breasted flycatcher, Myiobius villosus
Sulphur-rumped flycatcher, Myiobius barbatus

Tyrant flycatchers
Order: PasseriformesFamily: Tyrannidae

Tyrant flycatchers are passerine birds which occur throughout North and South America. They superficially resemble the Old World flycatchers, but are more robust and have stronger bills. They do not have the sophisticated vocal capabilities of the songbirds. Most, but not all, have plain coloring. As the name implies, most are insectivorous.

Wing-barred piprites, Piprites chloris
Cinnamon manakin-tyrant, Neopipo cinnamomea
White-throated spadebill, Platyrinchus mystaceus
Golden-crowned spadebill, Platyrinchus coronatus
White-crested spadebill, Platyrinchus platyrhynchos
Hazel-fronted pygmy-tyrant, Pseudotriccus simplex
Rufous-headed pygmy-tyrant, Pseudotriccus ruficeps
Ringed antpipit, Corythopis torquatus
Southern antpipit, Corythopis delalandi
Marble-faced bristle-tyrant, Phylloscartes ophthalmicus
Spectacled bristle-tyrant, Phylloscartes orbitalis
Mottle-cheeked tyrannulet, Phylloscartes ventralis
Cinnamon-faced tyrannulet, Phylloscartes parkeri
Streak-necked flycatcher, Mionectes striaticollis
Olive-striped flycatcher, Mionectes olivaceus
Ochre-bellied flycatcher, Mionectes oleagineus
McConnell's flycatcher, Mionectes macconnelli
Sepia-capped flycatcher, Leptopogon amaurocephalus
Slaty-capped flycatcher, Leptopogon superciliaris
Brownish twistwing, Cnipodectes subbrunneus
Rufous twistwing, Cnipodectes superrufus
Olivaceous flatbill, Rhynchocyclus olivaceus
Fulvous-breasted flatbill, Rhynchocyclus fulvipectus
Yellow-olive flycatcher, Tolmomyias sulphurescens
Yellow-margined flycatcher, Tolmomyias assimilis
Gray-crowned flycatcher, Tolmomyias poliocephalus
Yellow-breasted flycatcher, Tolmomyias flaviventris
White-bellied pygmy-tyrant, Myiornis albiventris
Short-tailed pygmy-tyrant, Myiornis ecaudatus
Long-crested pygmy-tyrant, Lophotriccus eulophotes
Snethlage's tody-tyrant, Hemitriccus minor
Yungas tody-tyrant, Hemitriccus spodiops
Flammulated pygmy-tyrant, Hemitriccus flammulatus
White-bellied tody-tyrant, Hemitriccus griseipectus
Johannes's tody-tyrant, Hemitriccus iohannis
Stripe-necked tody-tyrant, Hemitriccus striaticollis
Pearly-vented tody-tyrant, Hemitriccus margaritaceiventer
Zimmer's tody-tyrant, Hemitriccus minimus
Black-throated tody-tyrant, Hemitriccus granadensis
Buff-throated tody-tyrant, Hemitriccus rufigularis
White-cheeked tody-flycatcher, Poecilotriccus albifacies
Ochre-faced tody-flycatcher, Poecilotriccus plumbeiceps
Rusty-fronted tody-flycatcher, Poecilotriccus latirostris
Spotted tody-flycatcher, Todirostrum maculatum
Common tody-flycatcher, Todirostrum cinereum
Yellow-browed tody-flycatcher, Todirostrum chrysocrotaphum
Handsome flycatcher, Nephelomyias pulcher (H)
Ochraceous-breasted flycatcher, Nephelomyias ochraceiventris
Cliff flycatcher, Hirundinea ferruginea
Cinnamon flycatcher, Pyrrhomyias cinnamomeus
Bolivian tyrannulet, Zimmerius bolivianus
Red-billed tyrannulet, Zimmerius cinereicapilla
Slender-footed tyrannulet, Zimmerius gracilipes
Greater wagtail-tyrant, Stigmatura budytoides
Plain tyrannulet, Inezia inornata
Amazonian tyrannulet, Inezia subflava
Fulvous-crowned scrub-tyrant, Euscarthmus meloryphus
Rufous-sided scrub-tyrant, Euscarthmus rufomarginatus
White-lored tyrannulet, Ornithion inerme
Southern beardless-tyrannulet, Camptostoma obsoletum
Yellow-bellied elaenia, Elaenia flavogaster
Large elaenia, Elaenia spectabilis
White-crested elaenia, Elaenia albiceps
Small-billed elaenia, Elaenia parvirostris
Slaty elaenia, Elaenia strepera
Mottle-backed elaenia, Elaenia gigas
Brownish elaenia, Elaenia pelzelni
Plain-crested elaenia, Elaenia cristata
Lesser elaenia, Elaenia chiriquensis
Highland elaenia, Elaenia obscura
Sierran elaenia, Elaenia pallatangae
Yellow-crowned tyrannulet, Tyrannulus elatus
Forest elaenia, Myiopagis gaimardii
Gray elaenia, Myiopagis caniceps
Greenish elaenia, Myiopagis viridicata
Suiriri flycatcher, Suiriri suiriri
Yellow tyrannulet, Capsiempis flaveola
Rough-legged tyrannulet, Phyllomyias burmeisteri
Sclater's tyrannulet, Phyllomyias sclateri
Yungas tyrannulet, Phyllomyias weedeni
Planalto tyrannulet, Phyllomyias fasciatus
Tawny-rumped tyrannulet, Phyllomyias uropygialis
Mouse-colored tyrannulet, Phaeomyias murina
Buff-banded tyrannulet, Mecocerculus hellmayri
White-banded tyrannulet, Mecocerculus stictopterus
White-throated tyrannulet, Mecocerculus leucophrys
Ash-breasted tit-tyrant, Anairetes alpinus
Yellow-billed tit-tyrant, Anairetes flavirostris
Tufted tit-tyrant, Anairetes parulus
Bearded tachuri, Polystictus pectoralis
Sharp-tailed tyrant, Culicivora caudacuta
Crested doradito, Pseudocolopteryx sclateri
Subtropical doradito, Pseudocolopteryx acutipennis
Dinelli's doradito, Pseudocolopteryx dinelliana
Ticking doradito, Pseudocolopteryx citreola
Torrent tyrannulet, Serpophaga cinerea
River tyrannulet, Serpophaga hypoleuca
Sooty tyrannulet, Serpophaga nigricans
White-crested tyrannulet, Serpophaga subcristata
White-bellied tyrannulet, Serpophaga munda
Straneck's tyrannulet, Serpophaga griseicapilla
Rufous-tailed attila, Attila phoenicurus
Cinnamon attila, Attila cinnamomeus
Citron-bellied attila, Attila citriniventris
Dull-capped attila, Attila bolivianus
Bright-rumped attila, Attila spadiceus
Piratic flycatcher, Legatus leucophaius
Large-headed flatbill, Ramphotrigon megacephalum
Rufous-tailed flatbill, Ramphotrigon ruficauda
Dusky-tailed flatbill, Ramphotrigon fuscicauda
Great kiskadee, Pitangus sulphuratus
Lesser kiskadee, Philohydor lictor
Cattle tyrant, Machetornis rixosa
Sulphury flycatcher, Tyrannopsis sulphurea
Boat-billed flycatcher, Megarynchus pitangua
Golden-crowned flycatcher, Myiodynastes chrysocephalus
Sulphur-bellied flycatcher, Myiodynastes luteiventris
Streaked flycatcher, Myiodynastes maculatus
Rusty-margined flycatcher, Myiozetetes cayanensis
Social flycatcher, Myiozetetes similis
Gray-capped flycatcher, Myiozetetes granadensis
Dusky-chested flycatcher, Myiozetetes luteiventris
Yellow-throated flycatcher, Conopias parvus (H)
Three-striped flycatcher, Conopias trivirgatus
Lemon-browed flycatcher, Conopias cinchoneti (H)
Variegated flycatcher, Empidonomus varius
Crowned slaty flycatcher, Empidonomus aurantioatrocristatus
White-throated kingbird, Tyrannus albogularis
Tropical kingbird, Tyrannus melancholicus
Fork-tailed flycatcher, Tyrannus savana
Eastern kingbird, Tyrannus tyrannus
Grayish mourner, Rhytipterna simplex
Pale-bellied mourner, Rhytipterna immunda
Rufous casiornis, Casiornis rufus
White-rumped sirystes, Sirystes albocinereus
Sibilant sirystes, Sirystes sibilator
Dusky-capped flycatcher, Myiarchus tuberculifer
Swainson's flycatcher, Myiarchus swainsoni
Short-crested flycatcher, Myiarchus ferox
Pale-edged flycatcher, Myiarchus cephalotes
Brown-crested flycatcher, Myiarchus tyrannulus
Long-tailed tyrant, Colonia colonus
Unadorned flycatcher, Myiophobus inornatus
Roraiman flycatcher, Myiophobus roraimae (H)
Bran-colored flycatcher, Myiophobus fasciatus
Crowned chat-tyrant, Ochthoeca frontalis
Golden-browed chat-tyrant, Ochthoeca pulchella
Slaty-backed chat-tyrant, Ochthoeca cinnamomeiventris
Rufous-breasted chat-tyrant, Ochthoeca rufipectoralis
Brown-backed chat-tyrant, Ochthoeca fumicolor
d'Orbigny's chat-tyrant, Ochthoeca oenanthoides
White-browed chat-tyrant, Ochthoeca leucophrys
Chapada flycatcher, Guyramemua affinis
Amazonian scrub-flycatcher, Sublegatus obscurior
Southern scrub-flycatcher, Sublegatus modestus
Vermilion flycatcher, Pyrocephalus rubinus
Black-backed water-tyrant, Fluvicola albiventer
White-headed marsh tyrant, Arundinicola leucocephala
Streamer-tailed tyrant, Gubernetes yetapa
Cock-tailed tyrant, Alectrurus tricolor
Austral negrito, Lessonia rufa
Andean negrito, Lessonia oreas
Spectacled tyrant, Hymenops perspicillatus
Rufous-tailed tyrant, Knipolegus poecilurus
Plumbeous black-tyrant, Knipolegus cabanisi
Cinereous tyrant, Knipolegus striaticeps
White-winged black-tyrant, Knipolegus aterrimus
Hudson's black-tyrant, Knipolegus hudsoni
Yellow-browed tyrant, Satrapa icterophrys
Little ground-tyrant, Muscisaxicola fluviatilis
Spot-billed ground-tyrant, Muscisaxicola maculirostris
Taczanowski's ground-tyrant, Muscisaxicola griseus
Puna ground-tyrant, Muscisaxicola juninensis
Cinereous ground-tyrant, Muscisaxicola cinereus
White-fronted ground-tyrant, Muscisaxicola albifrons
Ochre-naped ground-tyrant, Muscisaxicola flavinucha
Rufous-naped ground-tyrant, Muscisaxicola rufivertex
White-browed ground-tyrant, Muscisaxicola albilora
Cinnamon-bellied ground-tyrant, Muscisaxicola capistratus
Black-fronted ground-tyrant, Muscisaxicola frontalis
Red-rumped bush-tyrant, Cnemarchus erythropygius
Rufous-webbed bush-tyrant, Cnemarchus rufipennis
White-rumped monjita, Xolmis velatus
White monjita, Xolmis irupero
Gray monjita, Nengetus cinereus
Black-crowned monjita, Neoxolmis coronatus
Black-billed shrike-tyrant, Agriornis montanus
White-tailed shrike-tyrant, Agriornis albicauda
Gray-bellied shrike-tyrant, Agriornis micropterus
Lesser shrike-tyrant, Agriornis murinus
Streak-throated bush-tyrant, Myiotheretes striaticollis
Rufous-bellied bush-tyrant, Myiotheretes fuscorufus
Drab water tyrant, Ochthornis littoralis
Fuscous flycatcher, Cnemotriccus fuscatus
Euler's flycatcher, Lathrotriccus euleri
Olive flycatcher, Mitrephanes olivaceus
Black phoebe, Sayornis nigricans
Alder flycatcher, Empidonax alnorum
Olive-sided flycatcher, Contopus cooperi
Smoke-colored pewee, Contopus fumigatus
Western wood-pewee, Contopus sordidulus
Eastern wood-pewee, Contopus virens
Tropical pewee, Contopus cinereus
Many-colored rush tyrant, Tachuris rubrigastra

Vireos
Order: PasseriformesFamily: Vireonidae

The vireos are a group of small to medium-sized passerine birds. They are typically greenish in color and resemble wood warblers apart from their heavier bills.

Rufous-browed peppershrike, Cyclarhis gujanensis
Gray-eyed greenlet, Hylophilus amaurocephalus (H)
Rufous-crowned greenlet, Hylophilus poicilotis
Ashy-headed greenlet, Hylophilus pectoralis
Gray-chested greenlet, Hylophilus semicinereus
Lemon-chested greenlet, Hylophilus thoracicus
Slaty-capped shrike-vireo, Vireolanius leucotis
Tawny-crowned greenlet, Tunchiornis ochraceiceps
Dusky-capped greenlet, Pachysylvia hypoxantha
Buff-cheeked greenlet, Pachysylvia muscicapina
Brown-capped vireo, Vireo leucophrys
Red-eyed vireo, Vireo olivaceus
Chivi vireo, Vireo chivi
Yellow-green vireo, Vireo flavoviridis

Jays
Order: PasseriformesFamily: Corvidae

The family Corvidae includes crows, ravens, jays, choughs, magpies, treepies, nutcrackers, and ground jays. Corvids are above average in size among the Passeriformes, and some of the larger species show high levels of intelligence.

White-collared jay, Cyanolyca viridicyana
Violaceous jay, Cyanocorax violaceus
Purplish jay, Cyanocorax cyanomelas
Curl-crested jay, Cyanocorax cristatellus
Plush-crested jay, Cyanocorax chrysops
Green jay, Cyanocorax yncas

Swallows
Order: PasseriformesFamily: Hirundinidae

The family Hirundinidae is adapted to aerial feeding. They have a slender streamlined body, long pointed wings, and a short bill with a wide gape. The feet are adapted to perching rather than walking, and the front toes are partially joined at the base.

Blue-and-white swallow, Pygochelidon cyanoleuca
Black-collared swallow, Pygochelidon melanoleuca
Tawny-headed swallow, Alopochelidon fucata
Brown-bellied swallow, Orochelidon murina
Pale-footed swallow, Orochelidon flavipes
Andean swallow, Orochelidon andecola
White-banded swallow, Atticora fasciata
White-thighed swallow, Atticora tibialis
Southern rough-winged swallow, Stelgidopteryx ruficollis
Brown-chested martin, Progne tapera
Purple martin, Progne subis
Gray-breasted martin, Progne chalybea
Southern martin, Progne elegans
White-winged swallow, Tachycineta albiventer
White-rumped swallow, Tachycineta leucorrhoa
Chilean swallow, Tachycineta leucopyga (V)
Bank swallow, Riparia riparia
Barn swallow, Hirundo rustica
Cliff swallow, Petrochelidon pyrrhonota

Wrens
Order: PasseriformesFamily: Troglodytidae

The wrens are mainly small and inconspicuous except for their loud songs. These birds have short wings and thin down-turned bills. Several species often hold their tails upright. All are insectivorous.

Scaly-breasted wren, Microcerculus marginatus
Gray-mantled wren, Odontorchilus branickii
Tooth-billed wren, Odontorchilus cinereus
House wren, Troglodytes aedon
Mountain wren, Troglodytes solstitialis
Grass wren, Cistothorus platensis
Thrush-like wren, Campylorhynchus turdinus
Moustached wren, Pheugopedius genibarbis
Buff-breasted wren, Cantorchilus leucotis
Fawn-breasted wren, Cantorchilus guarayanus
Fulvous wren, Cinnycerthia fulva
Gray-breasted wood-wren, Henicorhina leucophrys
Chestnut-breasted wren, Cyphorhinus thoracicus
Musician wren, Cyphorhinus arada

Gnatcatchers
Order: PasseriformesFamily: Polioptilidae

These dainty birds resemble Old World warblers in their build and habits, moving restlessly through the foliage seeking insects. The gnatcatchers and gnatwrens are mainly soft bluish gray in color and have the typical insectivore's long sharp bill. They are birds of fairly open woodland or scrub, which nest in bushes or trees.

Half-collared gnatwren, Microbates cinereiventris
Trilling gnatwren, Ramphocaenus melanurus
Chattering gnatwren, Ramphocaenus sticturus
Masked gnatcatcher, Polioptila dumicola

Donacobius
Order: PasseriformesFamily: Donacobiidae

The black-capped donacobius is found in wet habitats from Panama across northern South America and east of the Andes to Argentina and Paraguay.

Black-capped donacobius, Donacobius atricapilla

Dippers
Order: PasseriformesFamily: Cinclidae

Dippers are a group of perching birds whose habitat includes aquatic environments in the Americas, Europe, and Asia. They are named for their bobbing or dipping movements.

White-capped dipper, Cinclus leucocephalus
Rufous-throated dipper, Cinclus schulzii

Thrushes
Order: PasseriformesFamily: Turdidae

The thrushes are a group of passerine birds that occur mainly in the Old World. They are plump, soft plumaged, small to medium-sized insectivores or sometimes omnivores, often feeding on the ground. Many have attractive songs.

Andean solitaire, Myadestes ralloides
Slaty-backed nightingale-thrush, Catharus fuscater
Speckled nightingale-thrush, Catharus maculatus 
Veery, Catharus fuscescens
Swainson's thrush, Catharus ustulatus
White-eared solitaire, Entomodestes leucotis
Pale-eyed thrush, Turdus leucops
Pale-breasted thrush, Turdus leucomelas
Hauxwell's thrush, Turdus hauxwelli
Rufous-bellied thrush, Turdus rufiventris
Unicolored thrush, Turdus haplochrous (E)
Lawrence's thrush, Turdus lawrencii
Creamy-bellied thrush, Turdus amaurochalinus
Black-billed thrush, Turdus ignobilis
Andean slaty thrush, Turdus nigriceps
Great thrush, Turdus fuscater
Chiguanco thrush, Turdus chiguanco
Glossy-black thrush, Turdus serranus
White-necked thrush, Turdus albicollis

Mockingbirds
Order: PasseriformesFamily: Mimidae

The mimids are a family of passerine birds that includes thrashers, mockingbirds, tremblers, and the New World catbirds. These birds are notable for their vocalizations, especially their ability to mimic a wide variety of birds and other sounds heard outdoors. Their coloring tends towards dull grays and browns.

Patagonian mockingbird, Mimus patagonicus (H)
Chalk-browed mockingbird, Mimus saturninus
White-banded mockingbird, Mimus triurus
Brown-backed mockingbird, Mimus dorsalis

Old World sparrows
Order: PasseriformesFamily: Passeridae

Sparrows are small passerine birds. In general, sparrows tend to be small, plump, brown or gray birds with short tails and short powerful beaks. Sparrows are seed eaters, but they also consume small insects.

House sparrow, Passer domesticus (I)

Pipits and wagtails
Order: PasseriformesFamily: Motacillidae

Motacillidae is a family of small passerine birds with medium to long tails. They include the wagtails, longclaws, and pipits. They are slender ground-feeding insectivores of open country.

Yellowish pipit, Anthus chii
Short-billed pipit, Anthus furcatus
Correndera pipit, Anthus correndera
Hellmayr's pipit, Anthus hellmayri
Paramo pipit, Anthus bogotensis

Finches
Order: PasseriformesFamily: Fringillidae

Finches are seed-eating passerine birds that are small to moderately large and have a strong beak, usually conical and in some species very large. All have twelve tail feathers and nine primaries. These birds have a bouncing flight with alternating bouts of flapping and gliding on closed wings, and most sing well.

Thick-billed siskin, Spinus crassirostris
Hooded siskin, Spinus magellanicus
Olivaceous siskin, Spinus olivaceus
Yellow-bellied siskin, Spinus xanthogastrus
Black siskin, Spinus atratus
Yellow-rumped siskin, Spinus uropygialis
Golden-rumped euphonia, Chlorophonia cyanocephala
Blue-naped chlorophonia, Chlorophonia cyanea
Purple-throated euphonia, Euphonia chlorotica
Golden-bellied euphonia, Euphonia chrysopasta
White-vented euphonia, Euphonia minuta
Thick-billed euphonia, Euphonia laniirostris
Orange-bellied euphonia, Euphonia xanthogaster
Bronze-green euphonia, Euphonia mesochrysa
Rufous-bellied euphonia, Euphonia rufiventris

Sparrows
Order: PasseriformesFamily: Passerellidae

Most of the species are known as sparrows, but these birds are not closely related to the Old World sparrows which are in the family Passeridae. Many of these have distinctive head patterns.

Short-billed chlorospingus, Chlorospingus parvirostris
Common chlorospingus, Chlorospingus flavopectus
Yungas sparrow, Rhynchospiza dabennei
Chaco sparrow, Rhynchospiza strigiceps
Grassland sparrow, Ammodramus humeralis
Yellow-browed sparrow, Ammodramus aurifrons
White-browed brushfinch, Arremon torquatus
Pectoral sparrow, Arremon taciturnus
Moss-backed sparrow, Arremon dorbignii
Saffron-billed sparrow, Arremon flavirostris
Rufous-collared sparrow, Zonotrichia capensis
Black-faced brushfinch, Atlapetes melanolaemus
Bolivian brushfinch, Atlapetes rufinucha (E)
Fulvous-headed brushfinch, Atlapetes fulviceps

Blackbirds
Order: PasseriformesFamily: Icteridae

The icterids are a group of small to medium-sized, often colorful, passerine birds restricted to the New World and include the grackles, New World blackbirds, and New World orioles. Most species have black as the predominant plumage color, often enlivened by yellow, orange, or red.

Bobolink, Dolichonyx oryzivorus
Red-breasted meadowlark, Leistes militaris
White-browed meadowlark, Leistes superciliaris
Yellow-billed cacique, Amblycercus holosericeus
Russet-backed oropendola, Psarocolius angustifrons
Dusky-green oropendola, Psarocolius atrovirens
Green oropendola, Psarocolius viridis
Crested oropendola, Psarocolius decumanus
Olive oropendola, Psarocolius bifasciatus
Solitary black cacique, Cacicus solitarius
Golden-winged cacique, Cacicus chrysopterus
Yellow-rumped cacique, Cacicus cela
Mountain cacique, Cacicus chrysonotus
Red-rumped cacique, Cacicus haemorrhous
Casqued cacique, Cacicus oseryi
Orange-backed troupial, Icterus croconotus
Epaulet oriole, Icterus cayanensis
Variable oriole, Icterus pyrrhopterus
Screaming cowbird, Molothrus rufoaxillaris
Giant cowbird, Molothrus oryzivorus
Shiny cowbird, Molothrus bonariensis
Velvet-fronted grackle, Lampropsar tanagrinus
Scarlet-headed blackbird, Amblyramphus holosericeus
Chopi blackbird, Gnorimopsar chopi
Grayish baywing, Agelaioides badius
Bolivian blackbird, Oreopsar bolivianus (E)
Unicolored blackbird, Agelasticus cyanopus
Yellow-winged blackbird, Agelasticus thilius
Chestnut-capped blackbird, Chrysomus ruficapillus

Wood-warblers
Order: PasseriformesFamily: Parulidae

The wood-warblers are a group of small, often colorful, passerine birds restricted to the New World. Most are arboreal, but some are terrestrial. Most members of this family are insectivores.

Black-and-white warbler, Mniotilta varia (H)
Connecticut warbler, Oporornis agilis
Masked yellowthroat, Geothlypis aequinoctialis
Cerulean warbler, Setophaga cerulea
Tropical parula, Setophaga pitiayumi
Blackburnian warbler, Setophaga fusca (H)
Yellow warbler, Setophaga petechia (H)
Blackpoll warbler, Setophaga striata (H)
Citrine warbler, Myiothlypis luteoviridis
Flavescent warbler, Myiothlypis flaveola
Pale-legged warbler, Myiothlypis signata
Buff-rumped warbler, Myiothlypis fulvicauda
Riverbank warbler, Myiothlypis rivularis
Two-banded warbler, Myiothlypis bivittata
Golden-bellied warbler, Myiothlypis chrysogaster
Russet-crowned warbler, Myiothlypis coronata
Golden-crowned warbler, Basileuterus culicivorus
Three-striped warbler, Basileuterus tristriatus
Canada warbler, Cardellina canadensis (H)
Slate-throated redstart, Myioborus miniatus
Brown-capped redstart, Myioborus brunniceps
Spectacled redstart, Myioborus melanocephalus

Mitrospingids
Order: PasseriformesFamily: Mitrospingidae

Until 2017 the four species in this family were included in the family Thraupidae, the "true" tanagers.

Red-billed pied tanager, Lamprospiza melanoleuca

Cardinal grosbeaks
Order: PasseriformesFamily: Cardinalidae

The cardinals are a family of robust, seed-eating birds with strong bills. They are typically associated with open woodland. The sexes usually have distinct plumages.

Hepatic tanager, Piranga flava
Summer tanager, Piranga rubra
Scarlet tanager, Piranga olivacea
White-winged tanager, Piranga leucoptera
Red-crowned ant-tanager, Habia rubica
Carmiol's tanager, Chlorothraupis carmioli
Black-backed grosbeak, Pheucticus aureoventris
Rose-breasted chat, Granatellus pelzelni
Amazonian grosbeak, Cyanoloxia rothschildii
Ultramarine grosbeak, Cyanoloxia brissonii

Tanagers
Order: PasseriformesFamily: Thraupidae

The tanagers are a large group of small to medium-sized passerine birds restricted to the New World, mainly in the tropics. Many species are brightly colored. As a family they are omnivorous, but individual species specialize in eating fruits, seeds, insects, or other types of food. Most have short, rounded wings.

Hooded tanager, Nemosia pileata
Yellow-shouldered grosbeak, Parkerthraustes humeralis
Plushcap, Catamblyrhynchus diadema
Green honeycreeper, Chlorophanes spiza
Guira tanager, Hemithraupis guira
Yellow-backed tanager, Hemithraupis flavicollis
Pearly-breasted conebill, Conirostrum margaritae
Chestnut-vented conebill, Conirostrum speciosum
Giant conebill, Conirostrum binghami
White-browed conebill, Conirostrum ferrugineiventre
Blue-backed conebill, Conirostrum sitticolor
Capped conebill, Conirostrum albifrons
Cinereous conebill, Conirostrum cinereum
Stripe-tailed yellow-finch, Sicalis citrina
Puna yellow-finch, Sicalis lutea
Bright-rumped yellow-finch, Sicalis uropygialis
Citron-headed yellow-finch, Sicalis luteocephala
Greenish yellow-finch, Sicalis olivascens
Saffron finch, Sicalis flaveola
Grassland yellow-finch, Sicalis luteola
Black-hooded sierra finch, Phrygilus atriceps
Peruvian sierra finch, Phrygilus punensis
Plumbeous sierra finch, Geospizopsis unicolor
Ash-breasted sierra finch, Geospizopsis plebejus
Mourning sierra finch, Rhopospina fruticeti
Band-tailed sierra finch, Rhopospina alaudina
Blue finch, Rhopospina caerulescens
Red-backed sierra finch, Idiopsar dorsalis
White-throated sierra finch, Idiopsar erythronotus
Glacier finch, Idiopsar speculifer
Boulder finch, Idiopsar brachyurus
Band-tailed seedeater, Catamenia analis
Plain-colored seedeater, Catamenia inornata
Paramo seedeater, Catamenia homochroa
Moustached flowerpiercer, Diglossa mystacalis
Black-throated flowerpiercer, Diglossa brunneiventris
Gray-bellied flowerpiercer, Diglossa carbonaria (E)
Rusty flowerpiercer, Diglossa sittoides
Deep-blue flowerpiercer, Diglossa glauca
Bluish flowerpiercer, Diglossa caerulescens
Masked flowerpiercer, Diglossa cyanea
Slaty finch, Haplospiza rustica
Blue-black grassquit, Volatinia jacarina
Black-and-white tanager, Conothraupis speculigera (H)
Slaty tanager, Creurgops dentatus
Flame-crested tanager, Loriotus cristatus
Yellow-crested tanager, Loriotus rufiventer
White-shouldered tanager, Loriotus luctuosus
White-lined tanager, Tachyphonus rufus
Red-shouldered tanager, Tachyphonus phoenicius
Gray-headed tanager, Eucometis penicillata
Black-goggled tanager, Trichothraupis melanops
Inti tanager, Heliothraupis oneilli
Red-crested finch, Coryphospingus cucullatus
Masked crimson tanager, Ramphocelus nigrogularis
Silver-beaked tanager, Ramphocelus carbo
White-winged shrike-tanager, Lanio versicolor
Coal-crested finch, Charitospiza eucosma
Short-billed honeycreeper, Cyanerpes nitidus
Purple honeycreeper, Cyanerpes caeruleus
Red-legged honeycreeper, Cyanerpes cyaneus
Swallow tanager, Tersina viridis
Black-faced dacnis, Dacnis lineata
Yellow-bellied dacnis, Dacnis flaviventer
Blue dacnis, Dacnis cayana
Lesson's seedeater, Sporophila bouvronides
Lined seedeater, Sporophila lineola
White-bellied seedeater, Sporophila leucoptera
Chestnut-bellied seedeater, Sporophila castaneiventris
Black-and-tawny seedeater, Sporophila nigrorufa
Pearly-bellied seedeater, Sporophila pileata (H)
Tawny-bellied seedeater, Sporophila hypoxantha
Dark-throated seedeater, Sporophila ruficollis
Rufous-rumped seedeater, Sporophila hypochroma
Chestnut-bellied seed-finch, Sporophila angolensis
Great-billed seed-finch, Sporophila maximiliani
Large-billed seed-finch, Sporophila crassirostris
Black-billed seed-finch, Sporophila atrirostris
Wing-barred seedeater, Sporophila americana
Black-and-white seedeater, Sporophila luctuosa
Yellow-bellied seedeater, Sporophila nigricollis
Double-collared seedeater, Sporophila caerulescens
Slate-colored seedeater, Sporophila schistacea
Plumbeous seedeater, Sporophila plumbea
Rusty-collared seedeater, Sporophila collaris
Many-colored chaco finch, Saltatricula multicolor
Black-throated saltator, Saltatricula atricollis
Buff-throated saltator, Saltator maximus
Bluish-gray saltator, Saltator coerulescens
Green-winged saltator, Saltator similis
Golden-billed saltator, Saltator aurantiirostris
Slate-colored grosbeak, Saltator grossus
Black-masked finch, Coryphaspiza melanotis
Great Pampa-finch, Embernagra platensis
Wedge-tailed grass-finch, Emberizoides herbicola
Drab hemispingus, Pseudospingus xanthophthalmus
Gray-hooded bush tanager, Cnemoscopus rubrirostris (H)
Bolivian warbling finch, Poospiza boliviana
Black-and-chestnut warbling finch, Poospiza whitii
Cochabamba mountain finch, Poospiza garleppi (E)
Tucuman mountain finch, Poospiza baeri (H)
Rufous-sided warbling finch, Poospizopsis hypochondria
Orange-browed hemispingus, Kleinothraupis calophrys
Black-eared hemispingus, Sphenopsis melanotis
Orange-headed tanager, Thlypopsis sordida
Rust-and-yellow tanager, Thlypopsis ruficeps
Superciliaried hemispingus, Thlypopsis superciliaris
Rusty-browed warbling finch, Microspingus erythrophrys
Three-striped hemispingus, Microspingus trifasciatus
Ringed warbling finch, Microspingus torquatus
Black-capped warbling finch, Microspingus melanoleucus
White-rumped tanager, Cypsnagra hirundinacea
Long-tailed reed finch, Donacospiza albifrons
Bananaquit, Coereba flaveola
Dull-colored grassquit, Asemospiza obscura
Sooty grassquit, Asemospiza fuliginosa (V)
Orange-eared tanager, Chlorochrysa calliparaea
Black-crested finch, Lophospingus pusillus
Gray-crested finch, Lophospingus griseocristatus
White-banded tanager, Neothraupis fasciata
Diuca finch, Diuca diuca
Red-crested cardinal, Paroaria coronata
Red-capped cardinal, Paroaria gularis
Yellow-billed cardinal, Paroaria capitata
Black-faced tanager, Schistochlamys melanopis
Magpie tanager, Cissopis leverianus
Golden-collared tanager, Iridosornis jelskii
Fawn-breasted tanager, Pipraeidea melanonota
Blue-and-yellow tanager, Rauenia bonariensis
Rufous-bellied mountain tanager, Pseudosaltator rufiventris
Chestnut-bellied mountain tanager, Dubusia castaneoventris
Scarlet-bellied mountain tanager, Anisognathus igniventris
Blue-winged mountain tanager, Anisognathus somptuosus
Hooded mountain-tanager, Buthraupis montana
Blue-capped tanager, Sporathraupis cyanocephala
Grass-green tanager, Chlorornis riefferii
Golden-naped tanager, Chalcothraupis ruficervix
Silvery tanager, Stilpnia viridicollis (H)
Green-throated tanager, Stilpnia argyrofenges
Green-capped tanager, Stilpnia meyerdeschauenseei
Burnished-buff tanager, Stilpnia cayana
Masked tanager, Stilpnia nigrocincta
Blue-necked tanager, Stilpnia cyanicollis
Blue-and-black tanager, Tangara vassorii
Beryl-spangled tanager, Tangara nigroviridis
Blue-browed tanager, Tangara cyanotis
Turquoise tanager, Tangara mexicana
Paradise tanager, Tangara chilensis
Opal-rumped tanager, Tangara velia
Opal-crowned tanager, Tangara callophrys
Bay-headed tanager, Tangara gyrola
Golden-eared tanager, Tangara chrysotis
Saffron-crowned tanager, Tangara xanthocephala
Green-and-gold tanager, Tangara schrankii
Golden tanager, Tangara arthus
Blue-gray tanager, Thraupis episcopus
Sayaca tanager, Thraupis sayaca
Palm tanager, Thraupis palmarum
Yellow-bellied tanager, Ixothraupis xanthogastra
Spotted tanager, Ixothraupis punctata

Notes

References

See also
List of birds
Lists of birds by region

External links
Birds of Bolivia - World Institute for Conservation and Environment

Bolivia
 
Birds
Bolivia